Max Sedgley is a British producer, drummer and disc jockey, currently signed to the independent record label, Sunday Best (founded by Rob da Bank), and Jalapeno Records. In 2004, Sedgley released his first single, "Happy", a remix of which was later used by ITV as the theme music to their coverage of the Euro 2004 football tournament, was featured in the EA Sports game FIFA Street as well as in a promotional advert for Super Mario Galaxy. It has also been used on adverts for Ambrosia and Bacardi Rum. It reached #30 in the UK Singles Chart in July 2004.

Education
Sedgley was educated at Dulwich College, a boarding independent school for boys in Dulwich, in South London. Between the ages of 10 and 13, he studied percussion under James Blades. At the University of Edinburgh he studied composition, orchestration, percussion and piano, and graduated with a degree in classical music.

Life and career
On 17 July 2006, Sedgley released his 10-track debut album, From the Roots to the Shoots, on the Sunday Best label, which contained the singles "Slowly", "The Devil Inside", (which both featured guest Z-Star on lead vocals) and "Happy".

On 6 September 2010, Sedgley released his second album, Suddenly Everything, on Jalapeno Records, which contained the singles "Soundboy" featuring Tor, "Something Special" and "Superstrong" featuring Tasita D'mour.

He has played drums for many electronic musicians, most notably Roni Size.

Sedgley tours as both a DJ and in a five-piece musical ensemble, Max Sedgley and the Shoots. The band consists of Max Sedgley (drums, percussion, keyboards), Tasita D'mour (lead vocals), Mike Buchanan (guitar, lead and backing vocals), Andy ("V") Valentine (guitar, lead and backing vocals) and Marcus Dods (bass guitar).

Discography

References

External links
Spotify
Official Links
Sunday Best official site
Learn how to play iconic drum breaks online with Max Sedgley

Year of birth missing (living people)
Living people
Alumni of the University of Edinburgh
British male drummers
British record producers
British DJs
Club DJs
People educated at Dulwich College
Electronic dance music DJs